Walk the Line is a British music competition television series created and produced by Lifted Entertainment and Syco Entertainment. The ITV programme is presented by Maya Jama with a judging panel consisting of Gary Barlow, Craig David, Dawn French and Alesha Dixon. Simon Cowell was originally set to be the head judge on the panel, but was replaced by Barlow.

In August 2022, it was announced that the series had been canceled after one series.

Format
Walk the Line is a music competition where five music acts appear and compete for the grand final prize of £500,000. However, instead of going straight into the final, the winner of an episode has to decide whether to come back the next night to perform again with the risk of being dropped from the competition at that point. If they do not want to take that risk then they can take a monetary prize (£10,000 in the first episode, with the prize increasing by a further £10,000 each night), with the runner-up continuing on towards the grand prize by competing in the next episode.

Episode winners
The winner of the first three episodes was Bristol-born singer Ella Rothwell, who has previously released singles such as "Stop Calling", "Freedom" and "Velvet Heart" under the name Rothwell.

The winner of the fourth, fifth and final episode was London-based singer Nadiah Adu-Gyamfi, who has featured under the stage-name "Moko" on two singles by electronic music duo, Chase & Status including on the UK Top 5 hit single "Count On Me". Nadiah "Walked the Line" one final time in the last episode and won the audience vote, taking home the £500,000 jackpot.

Results summary
Colour key

Episodes
 – The singer received the most votes
 – The singer received the second highest votes
 – The singer cashed out of the competition

Episode 1 (12 December)

Episode 2 (13 December)

Episode 3 (14 December)

Episode 4 (15 December)  

Judge Alesha Dixon came into close contact with someone who later tested positive for COVID-19, therefore she judged this episode from home virtually.

Episode 5 (16 December)

Judge Alesha Dixon came into close contact with someone who later tested positive for COVID-19, therefore she judged this episode from home virtually.

Episode 6 (17 December)

Judge Gary Barlow performed his rendition of "Merry Christmas Everyone".

Ratings
The first episode of Walk the Line was watched by approximately 3 million viewers, with The Guardian reporting that viewing figures for the following Monday night episode had slumped to 2.1 million, meaning that the show was beaten in the ratings by BBC Two's Only Connect, with 2.7 million viewers tuning into the quiz. Tuesday's episode fell to 1.8 million, with the figure increasing to 2.05 million viewers once catch-up data was included. With data included from catch-up services over a seven-day period, the other episodes achieved ratings of 2.23 million, 2.07 million and 2.2 million viewers. Over the six-episode series, the show averaged 2.1 million viewers, a 14% share of the available audience.

References

External links

2021 British television series debuts
2021 British television series endings
2020s British music television series
2020s British reality television series
Singing talent shows
English-language television shows
ITV reality television shows
Television series by ITV Studios